The One Hundred Tenth United States Senate was the meeting of the Senate of the United States federal government, between January 3, 2007, and January 3, 2009, during the last two years of the second term of President George W. Bush.

Although the Democratic Party held fewer than 50 Senate seats, they had an operational majority because the two independent senators caucused with the Democrats for organizational purposes. No Democratic-held seats had fallen to the Republican Party in the 2006 elections.

Overview

Leadership

Members

References

110th United States Congress